The 1926 West Virginia Mountaineers football team represented West Virginia University as an independent during the 1926 college football season. In their second season under head coach Ira Rodgers, the Mountaineers compiled a 6–4 record and outscored opponents by a combined total of 141 to 93. The team played its home games at Mountaineer Field in Morgantown, West Virginia. Ross McHenry was the team captain.

Schedule

References

West Virginia
West Virginia Mountaineers football seasons
West Virginia Mountaineers football